Lleiguarda is one of 15 parishes (administrative divisions) in Belmonte de Miranda, a municipality within the province and autonomous community of Asturias, in northern Spain. 

Villages 
 Antuñana
 Beyu
 La Forniella
 Lleiguarda
 Menes
 Modreiros
 Pandu
 Silviella
 La Viña

References 

Parishes in Belmonte de Miranda